William Osgood Taylor (January 8, 1871 – July 15, 1955) was an American newspaper executive who served as publisher of The Boston Globe from 1921 to 1955.

Biography
Taylor's father was Charles H. Taylor, founder of The Boston Globe. Upon the elder Taylor's death in 1921, the younger Taylor became the second publisher of the Globe. A brother, John I. Taylor, is best remembered as owner of the Boston Red Sox from 1904 to 1914, while another brother, Charles H. Taylor Jr., was also an executive at the Globe.

Taylor was born in 1871 in Nashua, New Hampshire, attended Boston Latin School, and was an 1893 graduate of Harvard College. Taylor and Mary Moseley (1873–1944) were married in 1894, and had two sons and three daughters. Residing primarily in Boston, the family maintained a summer home on Buzzards Bay; in later life, Taylor resided in Marion, Massachusetts.

Taylor served as publisher until his death in 1955. His son William Davis Taylor then became the third publisher of the Globe. A grandson and namesake, William O. Taylor II, would also serve as publisher from 1978 to 1997.

References

External links

1871 births
1955 deaths
People from Nashua, New Hampshire
People from Boston
Boston Latin School alumni
Harvard College alumni
The Boston Globe people
American newspaper publishers (people)
Editors of Massachusetts newspapers
Taylor family